Riekert Hattingh (born 5 March 1994) is a United States rugby union player, currently playing for the Seattle Seawolves of Major League Rugby (MLR) and the United States national team. His preferred position is flanker or number 8.

Professional career
Hattingh signed for Major League Rugby side Seattle Seawolves for the 2021 Major League Rugby season, having represented the side since 2018. Hattingh made his debut for United States against England during the 2021 July rugby union tests.

References

External links
itsrugby.co.uk Profile

1994 births
Living people
United States international rugby union players
Rugby union flankers
Rugby union number eights
Rugby union players from Pretoria
Ohio Aviators players
Seattle Seawolves players
South African expatriate sportspeople in the United States
South African expatriate rugby union players
South African rugby union players
Expatriate rugby union players in the United States
Naturalized citizens of the United States